Pascal Bomati (born 13 October 1973 in Perpignan), is a French former professional rugby league and rugby union footballer. He has played rugby league for France.

Pascal Bomati began playing rugby league at with XIII Catalan, then with Paris Saint-Germain in the Super League. He switched code a first time, playing rugby union for CA Brive where he won the Heineken Cup, in 1997. In 2002 he joined USA Perpignan.

Honours 
 Heineken Cup 2003 with CA Brive
 European Challenge Cup 2000 with Section Paloise
 European Challenge Cup finalist 2003 with USA Perpignan
 French rugby champion finalist 2004 (player)

External links 
 

Sportspeople from Perpignan
French rugby league players
French rugby union players
France national rugby league team players
USA Perpignan players
1973 births
Living people
Paris Saint-Germain Rugby League players
XIII Catalan players
CA Brive players